William Hunter (born ) was a Scottish amateur golfer. He placed eighth in the 1872 Open Championship.

Early life
Hunter was born in Scotland circa 1850.

Golf career

1872 Open Championship
The 1872 Open Championship was the 12th Open Championship, held on 13 September at Prestwick Golf Club in Prestwick, South Ayrshire, Scotland. Tom Morris, Jr. won the Championship for the fourth consecutive time, by three strokes from the runner-up Davie Strath, having been five shots behind Strath before the final round. He was just  old.

Hunter carded rounds of 65-63-74=202 and finished in eighth place.

Results in major championships

Note: Hunter played only in The Open Championship.

DNP = Did not play
Yellow background for top-10

Death
Hunter's date of death is unknown, as is his date of birth.

References

Scottish male golfers
Amateur golfers
1850s births
Year of death missing